When Do You Commit Suicide? may refer to:

 When Do You Commit Suicide? (1931 film), a 1931 American comedy film 
 When Do You Commit Suicide? (1932 film), a 1932 American comedy film 
 When Do You Commit Suicide? (1953 film), a 1953 French comedy film